Com.x is a British comic publishing company.

History

2000–2002
Com.x was founded in 2000 by Eddie Deighton, Russell Uttley and Neil Googe. Deighton later described how the group came together in 1999:

The company published a number of titles in the following couple of years like Cla$$war by Rob Williams and Trevor Hairsine, Puncture by Uttley and Ben Oliver, Razorjack by John Higgins and Bazooka Jules by Googe.

Rob Williams suggested that the relatively greater impact Com.x had on the American publishing companies was:

The downside of this for the company was that their artists, like Trevor Hairsine, Ben Oliver, Joshua Middleton and Neil Googe, were snapped up by Marvel and DC.

They ran into bigger problems in 2002 when their offices were burgled and it took them time to recover. Other named projects, like Battle Raven Six by Antony Johnston, were never published and the company went quiet for over a year.

2003–2004
The second phase of the company's activity took place in 2003 and 2004. The first three issues of Cla$$war were collected into a trade paperback in 2003 and the series was finished in 2004 with new artist Travel Foreman. However, when interviewed in 2004 Googe said he did not feel the company had fully returned:

Other titles that were announced as returning, but never appeared, include Bazooka Jules with new artist LeSean Thomas and Thomas' own Cannon Busters.

2008–present
The company returned fully to comics publishing in 2008, led by Eddie Deighton and business partner Benjamin Shahrabani, with a more sustainable business model. To avoid delays in the releasing of series, Deighton said that "[o]ur publishing model, at least for the time being, is going to focus on graphic novel format, collected editions, complete story-arcs, etc."

This included the release of new original graphic novel Path by Gregory Baldwin, along with the collection of Razorjack and Cla$$war. Then they will roll out other titles, including Forty-Five written by Andi Ewington with forty-five comics artists, a softcover collection of Cla$$war and another creator-owned comic.

Titles

Titles published include:

Babble by writer Lee Robson, with art by Bryan Coyle
Bazooka Jules by Neil Googe
BlueSpear by writer Eddie Deighton/Andi Ewington, with art by Cosmo White
Cla$$war by writer Rob Williams, with art by Trevor Hairsine/Travel Foreman. Coloured by Len O'Grady
Codename: Babetool by writer Jose Luis Gaitan, with art by Walter Taborda
Duppy'78 by writer Casey Seijas, with art by Amancay Nahuelpan. Coloured by Daniel Warner
Forty-Five by writer Andi Ewington, with art by various artists
The Last American by writers Alan Grant/John Wagner, with art by Mike McMahon
Monster Myths by John Lupo Avanti
N-jin by writer Guy Haley, with art by Dan Boultwood. Coloured by Len O'Grady
O:R:E by writer Eddie Deighton and Jim Alexander
Path by Gregory Baldwin
Primal by writer Russell Uttley, with art by Joshua Middleton/Ben Oliver
Puncture by writer Russell Uttley, with art by Ben Oliver
Razorjack by John Higgins
SEEDS by Ross Mackintosh
Sky Between Branches by Joshua Middleton

Notes

References

External links

Comic book publishing companies of the United Kingdom
Publishing companies established in 2000
2000 establishments in the United Kingdom